A School District with the numbered designation of 43.  Among them are:

 School District 43 Coquitlam, British Columbia
 Apache Junction Unified School District No. 43, Arizona